Hlipiceni is a commune in Botoșani County, Western Moldavia, Romania. It is composed of three villages: Dragalina, Hlipiceni and Victoria.

References

Hlipiceni
Localities in Western Moldavia